Seo Young-joo (born February 16, 1998) is a South Korean actor. He won Best Actor at the Tokyo International Film Festival and Cinemanila International Film Festival for his performance in Juvenile Offender (2012).

Filmography

Film

Television series

Awards and nominations

References

External links
 
 
 
 

Living people
1998 births
South Korean male child actors
South Korean male film actors
South Korean male television actors
21st-century South Korean male actors
Sejong University alumni
Male actors from Seoul